106 may refer to:
106 (number), the number
AD 106, a year in the 2nd century AD
106 BC, a year in the 2nd century BC
106 (emergency telephone number), an Australian emergency number
106 (MBTA bus), a route of the Massachusetts Bay Transportation Authority

10/6 may refer to:
 October 6 (month-day date notation)
 June 10 (day-month date notation)
 10 shillings and 6 pence in UK predecimal currency
 the value of the half guinea in predecimal shillings and pence
 10/6, the price tag on the hat of the Hatter in Alice's Adventures in Wonderland

See also
 1/6 (disambiguation), for uses of "1/06"
Seaborgium, chemical element with atomic number 106